The Vega program (Cyrillic: ВеГа) was a series of Venus missions that also took advantage of the appearance of comet 1P/Halley in 1986. Vega 1 and Vega 2 were uncrewed spacecraft launched in a cooperative effort among the Soviet Union (who also provided the spacecraft and launch vehicle) and Austria, Bulgaria, France, Hungary, the German Democratic Republic, Poland, Czechoslovakia, and the Federal Republic of Germany in December 1984. They had a two-part mission to investigate Venus and also flyby Halley's Comet.

The flyby of Halley's Comet had been a late mission change in the Venera program following on from the cancellation of the American Halley mission in 1981. A later Venera mission was canceled and the Venus part of the Vega 1 mission was reduced. Because of this, the craft was designated VeGa, a contraction of Venera and Gallei (Венера and Галлей respectively, the Russian words for "Venus" and "Halley"). The spacecraft design was based on the previous Venera 9 and Venera 10 missions.

The two spacecraft were launched on 15 and 21 December 1984, respectively. With their redesignated dual missions, the Vega probes became part of the Halley Armada, a group of space probes that studied Halley's Comet during its 1985/1986 perihelion.

The Vega spacecraft

Vega 1 and Vega 2 were identical sister ships. The spacecraft was a development of the earlier Venera craft. They were designed by Babakin Space Center and constructed as 5VK by Lavochkin at Khimki. The craft was powered by twin large solar panels and instruments included an antenna dish, cameras, spectrometer, infrared sounder, magnetometers (MISCHA), and plasma probes. The  craft was launched by a Proton 8K82K rocket from Baikonur Cosmodrome, Tyuratam, Kazakh SSR (current Kazakhstan). Both Vega 1 and Vega 2 were three-axis stabilized spacecraft. The spacecraft were equipped with a dual bumper shield for dust protection from Halley's comet.

Bus Instruments

 imaging system
 infrared spectrometer
 ultraviolet, visible, infrared imaging spectrometer
 shield penetration detector
 dust detectors
 dust mass spectrometer
 neutral gas mass spectrometer
 APV-V plasma energy analyzer
 energetic-particle analyzer
 magnetometer
 wave and plasma analyzers

The Venus mission
 
The units were released some days before each arrived at Venus and entered the atmosphere without active inclination changes. Each contained a lander and a balloon explorer.

Descent craft
The landers were identical to that of the previous five Venera missions and were to study the atmosphere and surface. Each had instruments to study temperature and pressure, a UV spectrometer, a water concentration meter, a gas-phase chromatograph, an X-ray spectrometer, a mass spectrometer, and a surface sampling device.

It landed at 7.5°N, 177.7°E.

The Vega 2 lander touched down at 03:00:50 UT on 15 June 1985 at 8.5° S, 164.5° E, in eastern Aphrodite Terra. The surface sample was found to be an anorthosite-troctolite. The lander transmitted data from the surface for 56 minutes.

Payload

 Meteocomplex T,P sensors
 Sigma-3 gas chromatograph
 LSA particle size spectrometer
 IFP aerosol analyzer
 VM-4 hygrometer
 ISAV-A nephelometer/scatterometer
 Malakhit-V mass spectrometer
 ISAV-S UV spectrometer
 GZU VB-02 drill + BDRP-AM25 soil X-ray fluorescence spectrometer
 GS-15-STsV gamma ray spectrometer
 PrOP-V penetrometer
 MSB small solar batteries

Balloon

The instrument pack had enough battery power for 60 hours of operation and measured temperature, pressure, wind speed, and aerosol density. The balloon envelopes were surfaced with polytetrafluoroethylene to resist attack by the corrosive atmosphere. Both Vega-1 and Vega-2 balloons operated for more than 46 hours from injection to the final transmission.

The balloons were of spherical superpressure types of  diameter, filled with helium.

Beneath the antenna was a module containing the radio transmitter and system control electronics. The lower section of the gondola assembly carried the instrument payload and batteries.

The instruments consisted of:
 An arm carrying thin-film resistance thermometers and a velocity anemometer. The anemometer consisted of a free-spinning plastic propeller, whose spin was measured by LED-photodetector optointerrupters.
 A module containing a PIN diode photodetector to measure light levels and a vibrating-quartz-beam pressure sensor.
 A package at the bottom carrying the batteries and a nephelometer to measure cloud density through light reflection.

The small low-power (5 watt) transmitter only allowed a data transmission rate of 2,048 bit/s, though the system performed data compression to squeeze more information through the narrow bandwidth. Nonetheless, the sampling rate for most of the instruments was only once every 75 seconds.

At this altitude, pressure and temperature conditions of Venus are similar to those of Earth at 18,000 feet MSL (5,5 km), though the planet's winds move at hurricane velocity, and the carbon dioxide atmosphere is laced with sulphuric acid, along with smaller concentrations of hydrochloric and hydrofluoric acid.

The balloons moved swiftly across the night side of the planet into the light side, where their batteries finally died, and contact was lost. Tracking indicated that the motion of the balloons included a surprising vertical component, revealing vertical motions of air masses that had not been detected by earlier probe missions.

The Halley mission

After their encounters, the Vega motherships were redirected to intercept Comet Halley, utilizing the gravity of Venus to alter their trajectory.

The data intensive examination of the comet covered only the three hours around closest approach. They were intended to measure the physical parameters of the nucleus, such as dimensions, shape, temperature, and surface properties, as well as to study the structure and dynamics of the coma, the gas composition close to the nucleus, the dust particles' composition and mass distribution as functions of distance to the nucleus, and the cometary-solar wind interaction.

In total Vega 1 and Vega 2 returned about 1,500 images of Comet Halley. Spacecraft operations were discontinued a few weeks after the Halley encounters.

The on-board TV system was created in international cooperation of the scientific and industrial facilities from the USSR, Hungary, France, and Czechoslovakia. The TV data was processed by an international team, including scientists from the Soviet Union, Hungary, France, East Germany, and the United States. The basic steps of data acquisition and preprocessing were performed in IKI using an image processing computer system based on a PDP-11/40 compatible host.

Vega 1 and Vega 2 are currently in heliocentric orbits.

See also
 Pioneer Venus Orbiter
 Venera program

References

External links

Vega mission images from the Space Research Institute (IKI)
Raw data from Vega 1 and Vega 2 on board instruments
Soviet Exploration of Venus
HSAO/NASA Astrophysics Data System (ADS) – A tool for studying atmosphere dynamics on Venus

 
Missions to Halley's Comet
France–Soviet Union relations
Czechoslovakia–Soviet Union relations
Hungary–Soviet Union relations
Austria–Soviet Union relations
Germany–Soviet Union relations
Poland–Soviet Union relations
Bulgaria–Soviet Union relations